Edwin Jay Beckman (born January 2, 1955) is a former professional American football tight end in the National Football League (NFL). He played his entire eight year NFL career with the Kansas City Chiefs (1977–1984). He became the special teams coach of the Chiefs in 1987.

References

External links
 NFL.com player page
 Pro Football Reference page

1955 births
Living people
American football tight ends
Florida State Seminoles football players
Kansas City Chiefs coaches
Kansas City Chiefs players
People from Key West, Florida
Players of American football from Florida